Dr. Richard Grenfell Holmes (born 8 December 1947) is a South African psychologist and Paralympic athlete who competed at the 1972 Summer Paralympics.

Holmes competed in the Athletics at the 1972 Summer Paralympics in Heidelberg, West Germany, in the Men's Javelin, Shot Put and Discus 1A category, winning the bronze medal in Javelin 1A.

Holmes is the uncle of South African professional surfer Sean Holmes.

References

Living people
Paralympic athletes of South Africa
Athletes (track and field) at the 1972 Summer Paralympics
Medalists at the 1972 Summer Paralympics
Paralympic bronze medalists for South Africa
Wheelchair category Paralympic competitors
1947 births
Place of birth missing (living people)
Paralympic medalists in athletics (track and field)
South African male javelin throwers
South African male shot putters
South African male discus throwers
Wheelchair discus throwers
Wheelchair javelin throwers
Wheelchair shot putters
Paralympic discus throwers
Paralympic javelin throwers
Paralympic shot putters
20th-century South African people
21st-century South African people